Road Gang is a 1936 film directed by Louis King, written by Dalton Trumbo, produced by Bryan Foy, and starring Donald Woods and Kay Linaker. The film shows economic and social injustice due to political corruption.

Premise
The managing editor of a Chicago newspaper crusades for inmates (Donald Woods, Carlyle Moore Jr.) in a Southern prison camp.

Cast

 Donald Woods as James 'Jim' Larrabie
 Kay Linaker as Barbara Winston
 Carlyle Moore Jr. as Robert 'Bob' Gordon
 Joseph Crehan as Harry Shields
 Henry O'Neill as George Winston
 Joe King as J.W.Moett
 Addison Richards as Warden Parmenter
 Charles Middleton as Mine Warden Grayson
 Olin Howland as Doctor
 William B. Davidson as Atty. Gen. Marsden
 Harry Cording as Sam Dawson
 Mark Lawrence as Pete
 Eddie Shubert as Buck Draper
 Edward Van Sloan as Mr. Dudley
 Ben Hendricks Jr. as Jake
 George Lloyd'' as Hymie Seeball (the Gorilla)

External links 

1936 films
1936 drama films
1930s prison films
American black-and-white films
American prison drama films
Films about journalists
Films directed by Louis King
First National Pictures films
Films with screenplays by Dalton Trumbo
1930s English-language films
1930s American films